Ten Feet Tall and Bulletproof is the fourth studio album by American country music artist Travis Tritt. It was released on Warner Bros. Records in 1994. The tracks "Ten Feet Tall and Bulletproof", "Between an Old Memory and Me", "Foolish Pride", and "Tell Me I Was Dreaming" were released as singles, all charting in the Top 40 on the country charts. "Between an Old Memory and Me" was previously recorded by Keith Whitley on his 1989 album I Wonder Do You Think of Me. The album has been certificated 2× Platinum for sales of over 2,000,000 in the US.

Track listing

Personnel
The following credits are sourced from liner notes.

Main band
 Mike Brignardello – bass guitar
 Larry Byrom – acoustic guitar, slide guitar
 Hargus "Pig" Robbins – piano
 Travis Tritt – lead vocals
 Steve Turner – drums, percussion
 Billy Joe Walker, Jr. – electric guitar, acoustic guitar
 Reggie Young – electric guitar, 6-string bass guitar

Additional musicians

"Ten Feet Tall and Bulletproof"
 Stuart Duncan – fiddle
 Wendell Cox – electric guitar
 Terry Crisp – steel guitar
 Dennis Locorriere – backing vocals
 Jimmy Joe Ruggiere – harmonica

"Walkin' All Over My Heart"
 Sam Bacco – tambourine
 Aaron Braun – tremolo guitar
 Mark O'Connor – fiddle
 John Cowan – background vocals
 Terry Crisp – steel guitar
 Billy Livsey – Hammond organ, Wurlitzer electric piano

"Foolish Pride"
 Sam Bacco – percussion, tambourine, timpani
 Mark O'Connor – fiddle
 Paul Franklin – steel guitar
 Billy Livsey – hammond organ, Wurlitzer electric piano, harmonium
 Dennis Locorriere – backing vocals
 Dana McVicker – backing vocals

"Outlaws Like Us"
 Stuart Duncan – fiddle
 Paul Franklin – steel guitar
 Jack Holder – electric and acoustic guitars
 Waylon Jennings – vocals
 Billy Livsey – Hammond organ, Wurlitzer electric piano
 Dennis Locorriere – backing vocals
 Jimmy Joe Ruggiere – harmonica
 Marty Stuart – background vocals
 Hank Williams Jr. – vocals

"Hard Times and Misery"
 Paul Franklin – steel guitar, "The Box"
 Billy Livsey – Hammond organ, Vox Continental
 Dennis Locorriere – background vocals
 Jimmy Joe Ruggiere – harmonica
 Marty Stuart – electric and acoustic guitars, backing vocals

"Tell Me I Was Dreaming"
 Sam Bacco – timpani
 Paul Franklin – pedal steel guitar
 Jack Holder – electric guitar
 Billy Livsey – Hammond organ
 Dennis Locorriere – backing vocals
 Dana McVicker – backing vocals

"Wishful Thinking"
 John Cowan – backing vocals
 Jack Holder – electric guitar
 Billy Livsey – Hammond organ, clavinet
 Dennis Locorriere – backing vocals
 Dana McVicker – backing vocals
 Jimmy Joe Ruggiere – harmonica

"Between an Old Memory and Me"
 John Cowan – background vocals
 Stuart Duncan – fiddle
 Paul Franklin – pedal steel guitar
 Billy Livsey – Wurlitzer electric piano, Hammond organ

"No Vacation from the Blues"
 Jack Holder – electric guitar
 Billy Livsey – Hammond organ, harmonium
 Dennis Locorriere – backing vocals
 Dana McVicker – backing vocals
 Jimmy Joe Ruggiere – harmonica
 Marty Stuart – electric guitar

"Southern Justice"
 Sam Bacco – timpani, percussion, gong
 Stuart Duncan – fiddle
 Béla Fleck – banjo
 Paul Franklin – pedal steel guitar, "The Box", baritone steel guitar
 Jack Holder – electric guitars
 Dennis Locorriere – backing vocals
 Dana McVicker – backing vocals
 Edgar Meyer – double bass
 Jimmy Joe Ruggiere – harmonica
 Matt Rollings – piano

Recording personnel
 Gregg Brown – producer
 Greg Calbi – mastering engineer
 Bob Feaster – recording engineer (except "Southern Justice"), mixing engineer
 Chris Hammond – recording engineer ("Southern Justice" only)

Charts

Weekly charts

Year-end charts

References

1994 albums
Travis Tritt albums
Warner Records albums